DNA polymerase delta subunit 4, also known as DNA polymerase delta subunit p12, is a protein that in humans is encoded by the POLD4 gene.  It is a component of the  DNA polymerase delta complex.

References

Further reading